The 2020 UCI Track Cycling World Championships were held in Berlin, Germany from 26 February to 1 March 2020.

Schedule
20 events were held:

All times are local (UTC+1).

Medal summary

Medal table

Men

Women

Shaded events are non-Olympic

References

 
UCI Track Cycling World Championships by year
World Championships
2020 in German sport
International cycle races hosted by Germany
2020 in Berlin
Sports competitions in Berlin
UCI Track Cycling World Championships
UCI Track Cycling World Championships